The Building Regulations Advisory Committee (BRAC) is an advisory non-departmental public body of the government of the United Kingdom.

The Building Regulations Advisory Committee is a statutory advisory body that the Secretary of State will consult on proposals to make or change building regulations. In addition the Committee provides expert advice to the Secretary of State on building regulations or related matters. This includes for example the health and safety, welfare and convenience of people in and around buildings; energy conservation and the sustainability of buildings. The BRAC is sponsored by the Department for Communities and Local Government.

Composition 
BRAC membership consists of independent volunteers appointed due to their experience and expertise across the construction sector. Members are appointed for a 3-year term and can serve for a maximum of 3 terms. As of July 2017, the committee had 19 members.

Sub-committees 
The Building Control Performance Standards Advisory Group (BCPSAG) advises BRAC for England and BRAC for Wales on the performance of building control bodies.

The Competent Person Forum advises BRAC for England and BRAC for Wales on matters of interest for Competent Person Schemes who undertake self-certified building work in England and Wales.

External links 
   This article contains quotations from this source, which is available under the  Open Government Licence v3.0. © Crown copyright.

Construction trade groups based in the United Kingdom
Housing in the United Kingdom
Non-departmental public bodies of the United Kingdom government